Mangaldoi is a Lok Sabha constituency in the Indian state of Assam.

Assembly segments
Mangaldoi Lok Sabha constituency is composed of the following assembly segments:

Members of Parliament

Election results

General election 2019

General election 2014

General election 2009

See also
 Mangaldoi
 List of Constituencies of the Lok Sabha

References

External links
Mangaldoi lok sabha  constituency election 2019 date and schedule

Lok Sabha constituencies in Assam
Darrang district